Lockhart is an unincorporated community in Norman County, Minnesota, United States.

The community is located between Ada and Crookston near Minnesota State Highway 9 at County Road 22.

History
A post office called Lockhart was established in 1883, and remained in operation until 1976. The community bears the name of a landowner.

References

Rand McNally Road Atlas - 2007 edition - Minnesota entry
Official State of Minnesota Highway Map - 2007/2008 edition

Unincorporated communities in Minnesota
Unincorporated communities in Norman County, Minnesota